Howard Wright Alexander (19 June 1911, Toronto – 28 June 1985, Richmond, Indiana) was a Canadian-American mathematician.

Alexander emigrated from Canada to the United States in 1937. He received his Ph.D. in 1939 from Princeton University. As a Quaker, he was a conscientious objector during World War II and did alternative national service. At Earlham College he became an associate professor of mathematics in 1952 and retired there in 1976 as professor emeritus. He was an Invited Speaker at the International Congress of Mathematicians in 1950 in Cambridge, Massachusetts.

He married Mary Alice Nace in 1942; they had six children.

Selected publications

with Roland Frederick Smith:

References

External links
19600101 Howard Alexander - YouTube, uploaded 16 Nov. 2013

20th-century American mathematicians
Canadian emigrants to the United States
Princeton University alumni
Earlham College faculty
1911 births
1985 deaths
American Quakers
20th-century Quakers